Antelope Hill, formerly Antelope Peak, is a summit, at an elevation of 804 feet, near the Gila River in Yuma County, Arizona.

Antelope Peak was a landmark for travelers on the trails and roads along the course of the Gila River in previous centuries.  It was a location of a camp and watering place on the Southern Emigrant Trail, it was nearby the site of the Butterfield Overland Mail, Antelope Peak Station, a later stagecoach station located 15.14 miles east of Mission Camp, which replaced its older Filibusters Camp stage station.

References

Hills of Arizona
Landforms of Yuma County, Arizona
Stagecoach stops in the United States